Juan Caicedo (born 8 March 1955) is a Colombian footballer. He played in 15 matches for the Colombia national football team from 1981 to 1983. He was also part of Colombia's squad for the 1983 Copa América tournament.

References

External links
 

1955 births
Living people
Colombian footballers
Colombia international footballers
Place of birth missing (living people)
Association football midfielders
Atlético Junior footballers
América de Cali footballers
Independiente Medellín footballers
Once Caldas footballers